Nebet (“Lady”) was created vizier during the late Old Kingdom of Egypt by Pharaoh Pepi I of the Sixth Dynasty, her son-in-law.  She is the first recorded female vizier in Ancient Egyptian history; the next one was in the 26th Dynasty.

She was the wife of the nobleman Khui.

Her daughters the Queens Ankhesenpepi I and Ankhesenpepi II were respectively the mothers of the Pharaohs Merenre Nemtyemsaf and Pepi II.

Her son Djau born in, and had a tomb in Abydos, became vizier for his nephews.  She is mentioned in his tomb.

Vizier Nebet was a contemporary of Weni the Elder.

References

Sources
 , pp. 19, 76-77.

Viziers of the Sixth Dynasty of Egypt
24th-century BC women